Millennium House is a Grade II listed building in Stockport.

History
The building was initially established as a dispensary in 1792, and then incorporated as an infirmary in 1833. The infirmary was then expanded four times between 1871 and 1926. The building then remained unchanged until its closure in 1996.

The building was listed as Grade II on the Statutory List of Buildings of Special Architectural or Historic Interest on 10 March 1975.

The building was purchased by the Bruntwood Group and renovated into office space, currently used by the Department for Work and Pensions (DWP).

See also

Listed buildings in Stockport

References

History of the Metropolitan Borough of Stockport
Grade II listed buildings in the Metropolitan Borough of Stockport
1792 establishments in England
1833 establishments in England
Hospital buildings completed in 1871
Hospital buildings completed in 1926
Grade II listed hospital buildings